Theba macandrewiana is a species of land snail of the family Helicidae, endemic to the Savage Islands of Portugal.

Distribution and habitat
It is the only non-marine gastropod species known from the archipelago.

Threats
The species was threatened by previous introduction of rabbits (Oryctolagus cuniculus), mice (Mus musculus) and the tobacco tree (Nicotiana glauca) to the Selvagem Grande which were effectively eradicated in the early 2000's. Today, the species is susceptible to soil erosion and consequent landslides from rainstorms that affect the arid archipelago and also native lizards that may predate on eggs. In the longer term the species could be threatened by increased frequency of droughts and sea level changes due to climate change.

It represents about 35% of the diet of yellow-legged gulls that breed on the islands.

References

Helicidae
Molluscs of Africa
Savage Islands
Taxa named by Ludwig Karl Georg Pfeiffer
Gastropods described in 1853